Łukasz Marcin Kohut (born 10 September 1982) is a Polish politician of the Spring party who has been serving as a Member of the European Parliament since the 2019 elections.

In parliament, Kohut has since been serving on the Committee on Industry, Research and Energy. He later also joined the Committee on Civil Liberties, Justice and Home Affairs (2020) and the Committee of Inquiry to investigate the use of Pegasus and equivalent surveillance spyware (2022).  

In addition to his committee assignments, Kohut is part of the parliament's delegations to the EU-Serbia Stabilisation and Association Parliamentary Committee, for relations with Switzerland and Norway and to the EU-Iceland Joint Parliamentary Committee and the European Economic Area (EEA) Joint Parliamentary Committee. He is also a member of the European Parliament Intergroup on Western Sahara, the European Parliament Intergroup on Traditional Minorities, National Communities and Languages, and the URBAN Intergroup.

References

Living people
MEPs for Poland 2019–2024
Spring (political party) MEPs
Spring (political party) politicians
1982 births